The Irish Human Rights Commission has been merged with the Equality Authority. Both former organisations were dissolved and their functions transferred to a new statutory body, the Irish Human Rights and Equality Commission on 1 November 2014.

The Irish Human Rights Commission (IHRC) was a public body, state-funded but independent of government, that promoted and protected human rights in the Republic of Ireland. It was established in 2000 by an Act of the Oireachtas (the Irish parliament). As one of the two national human rights institutions (NHRIs) on the island of Ireland, like the Northern Ireland Human Rights Commission (NIHRC) its creation was a consequence of the Belfast (Good Friday) Agreement of 10 April 1998. It was required to maintain a joint committee with the NIHRC to consider human rights issues affecting both jurisdictions, such as a possible Charter of Rights for the Island of Ireland.

The IHRC had a full-time president and 14 other part-time commissioners, who served for five-year terms. The first president was Mr Justice Donal Barrington, a retired judge of the Supreme Court of Ireland, was succeeded in August 2002 by former Fine Gael senator Dr Maurice Manning.

The functions of the IHRC included advising on the compatibility of legislation with the rights protected by the Constitution of Ireland and by international treaties to which the state is party. It also engaged in human rights education and conducted inquiries into alleged violations of human rights.

See also
 Irish Human Rights and Equality Commission

References

External links
 Irish Human Rights Commission
 Northern Ireland Human Rights Commission
 
 Irish Human Rights and Equality Commission

Human rights in Ireland
2000 establishments in Ireland
2014 disestablishments in Ireland